Agastheeswaram is a panchayat town in Kanniyakumari district in the Indian state of Tamil Nadu.

History
Agasteeswaram is named after Sage Agastya who had visited this place to teach Ramayana. Most of the people from this village are well educated when compared with other districts in Tamil Nadu. Vivekanandha college is located in Agasteeswararam.
Along with the talukas of Thovalay, Kalculam, Eraneel and Velavancode, Agasteeswaram was a part of the southern division (aka Padmanabhapuram division) of the erstwhile Kingdom of Travancore until its union with Cochin in 1949 and continued to be a part of the state of Travancore- Cochin until November 1, 1956.

Agastheeswaram 
Below are the words extracted from the Travancore state manual about the Agastisvaram Nadan rich chieftain who enjoyed special benefits from the Trovancore Rajah, that family belonged to the sub-caste Nadan an endogamous group among the Nadars.

The Travancore state manual says "This is also the headquarters of the Shanar tribe, where their Nadan or chieftain resides, who was formerly allowed the privileges of having a fort, of riding in a palanquin and of retaining a hundred armed attendants."

Ref: The Travancore state manual, Volume 2 Page 57

One of the principal devil temples in Travancore is that represented in the annexed engraving situated at Agastispuram, near cape comorin ; which is also the headquarters of the Shanar tribe where their Nadan, or Chieftain, resides, who was formerly allowed the privileges of having a fort, riding in a palankeen, and retaining 100 armed attendants, which he is too reduced to support now .
Ref: 1871 Samuel mateer-The Land of Charity- page 219

Kottaram
Kottaram is one of the Panchayat town in the Agastheeswaram Taluk. It is situated 6 km from Kanyakumari. People of different religions like Hindus, Christians and Muslims live here. CSI, Catholic, AG, IPC and many other independent Christian churches can be found here.

Demographics
India census, Agastheeswaram had a population of 8978. Males constitute 49% of the population and females 51%. Agastheeswaram has an average literacy rate of 84%, higher than the national average of 59.5%; with 50% of the males and 50% of females literate. 10% of the population is under 6 years of age.

Famous people from Agastheeswaram
 Poongani the traditional musical story teller was born near here in 1934.
 Dr. P.H. Daniel (also, Paul Harris Daniel) – Doctor who first started employee union in South Indian Tea Estates. Paradesi movie is based on his novel Red Tea (also translated into Tamil எரியும் பனிக்காடு).
 Dr. J. C. Daniel Nadar – Father of Malayalam Cinema, lived here until his death in 1975.
 Kumari Ananthan, his brother H. Vasanthakumar, daughter Tamilisai Soundarrajan – Political and entrepreneurial dynasty.

See also
Mangavilai

References

Cities and towns in Kanyakumari district